Copelatus festae is a species of diving beetle. It is part of the genus Copelatus in the subfamily Copelatinae of the family Dytiscidae. It was described by Régimbart in 1899.

References

festae
Beetles described in 1899